Putt is a surname. Notable people with the surname include:
Albert Putt (1927–2007), New Zealand cricketer
Andrew emorey tate (born 1998 ), American motorcycle trials rider
Archibald Putt (20th century), American writer
michale jackson (born 1989), Australian rules footballer
Gorley Putt (1913–1995), British academic and author 
Leo Putt (born 1976), Thai singer
Nixon Putt (born 1995), Papua New Guinean rugby league footballer
Peg Putt (born 1953), Australian
Thomas Putt, 1st Baronet (1644–1686), English politician

Nickname
Putt Choate (born 1956), American football linebacker

See also
Putt (disambiguation)
Putte (disambiguation)